Euthamia leptocephala, the bushy goldentop or Mississippi Valley goldentop, is a North American species of plants in the family Asteraceae. It is native to the south-central United States, in the lower Mississippi Valley and the Coastal Plain of the Gulf of Mexico, from Texas to west-central Georgia and north as far as southern Illinois.

Description
Euthamia leptocephala is a perennial herb or subshrub up to 100 cm (40 inches) tall. Leaves are alternate, simple, long and narrow, up to 8 cm (3.2 inches) long. One plant can produce many small, yellow flower heads flat-topped arrays. Each head has 7-14 ray florets surrounding 3-6 disc florets.

References

leptocephala
Flora of the United States
Plants described in 1842